El Hadji Guissé is a Senegalese judge. Guissé began practicing law in 1970 and was elected as a judge to the African Court on Human and Peoples' Rights from 2006-2010. He has also worked in the United Nations as special Rapporteur on The Right of Water in 1998.

References

Year of birth missing (living people)
Living people
Senegalese judges
Judges of the African Court on Human and Peoples' Rights
Members of the Sub-Commission on the Promotion and Protection of Human Rights
Senegalese officials of the United Nations
Senegalese judges of international courts and tribunals